HOCPCA (3-hydroxycyclopent-1-enecarboxylic acid) is a compound with an affinity for the GHB receptor 39 times greater than that of GHB itself.

See also
 T-HCA

References

Neurochemistry
Carboxylic acids
GHB receptor agonists